Del Muerto is a census-designated place (CDP) in Apache County, Arizona, United States. The population was 329 at the 2010 census.

Geography
It lies within  of the north rim of Canyon del Muerto, a branch of Canyon de Chelly.

Education
The community is within the Chinle Unified School District, which operates Chinle High School.

Demographics

References

Census-designated places in Apache County, Arizona
Populated places on the Navajo Nation